Ševětín is a market town in České Budějovice District in the South Bohemian Region of the Czech Republic. It has about 1,400 inhabitants.

Economy
Ševětín Solar Park is located in Ševětín.

References

Populated places in České Budějovice District
Market towns in the Czech Republic